Beyond the Sacramento is a 1940 American Western film directed by Lambert Hillyer and written by Luci Ward. The film stars Wild Bill Elliott, Evelyn Keyes, Dub Taylor, John Dilson, Bradley Page and Frank LaRue. The film was released on November 11, 1940, by Columbia Pictures.

Plot

Cast          
Wild Bill Elliott as Wild Bill Hickok
Evelyn Keyes as Lynn Perry
Dub Taylor as Cannonball
John Dilson as Jason Perry
Bradley Page as Cord Crowley 
Frank LaRue as Jeff Adams 
Norman Willis as Nelson
Steve Clark as Curly
Jack Rube Clifford as Sheriff 
Don Beddoe as Warden McKay
Harry A. Bailey as Storekeeper

References

External links
 

1940 films
American Western (genre) films
1940 Western (genre) films
Columbia Pictures films
Films directed by Lambert Hillyer
American black-and-white films
1940s English-language films
1940s American films